Most of Alberta's mountains are found on the western edge of the province of Alberta, consisting of the eastern slopes of the Canadian Rockies, which run through the province from Alberta's mid-point to its southern border with the United States. Other elevated spots can be found in the Caribou Mountains and the Cypress Hills.

The peaks of the Canadian Rockies are majestic, many of them reaching a height of more than three kilometres above sea level. Alberta's southwestern boundary is traced on the Continental Divide, along the high ranges of the Rocky Mountains, and many peaks are located on the Alberta–British Columbia border. The peak of Mount Columbia, within Jasper National Park, is the highest point in Alberta, second highest in the Canadian Rockies and 28th highest in Canada.

The Caribou Mountains are located in the northern extremity of Alberta, forming an elevated plateau in the northern plains and wetlands. They reach an altitude of 1,030 m, almost 700 m higher than the surrounding area.

While not considered mountains, the Cypress Hills, located in the south-eastern corner of Alberta, extending into Saskatchewan, constitute the highest terrain in Canada between the Rocky Mountains and Labrador. They reach a maximum elevation of 1,468 m, 600 m above the surrounding prairie.



List of Mountains

Highest peaks
Mount Columbia - 
Twin Peaks massif - 
Mount Alberta - 
Mount Assiniboine - 
Mount Forbes - 
Mount Temple - 
Mount Brazeau - 
Snow Dome - 
Mount Kitchener - 
Mount Lyell -

List of ranges

Bare Range
Blairmore Range
Blue Range
Bosche Range
Brazeau Range
Caribou Mountains
Clark Range (Border Ranges)
Colin Range
Elk Range
Fairholme Range
Fiddle Range
Fisher Range
High Rock Range
Highwood Range
Jacques Range
Kananaskis Range
Livingstone Range
Maligne Range
Massive Range
Miette Range
Misty Range
Opal Range
Palliser Range
Queen Elizabeth Ranges
Ram Range
Sawback Range
Slate Range
De Smet Range
Spray Mountains
Valley of the Ten Peaks
Vermilion Range
Victoria Cross Ranges
Waputik Range
President Range
Winston Churchill Range

List of passes
The Rockies are crossed through east-west alpine passes, such as:
Abbot Pass
Crowsnest Pass
Kicking Horse Pass
Kiwetinok Pass
Sunwapta Pass
Weary Creek Gap
Yellowhead Pass

See also
Geography of Alberta
List of mountains of Canada
Mountain peaks of Canada
List of mountain peaks of North America
List of mountain peaks of the Rocky Mountains
Rocky Mountains

Gallery

References

External links

Statistics Canada - Principal heights by range or region
Peakfinder

 
Alberta
Mountains